Cold Winter Sun is a 2004 Spanish drama film directed and written by  which stars Unax Ugalde and Marisa Paredes alongside Javier Pereira, Marta Etura, Raquel Pérez, and Andrés Gertrúdix.

Plot 
The fiction is set in an unidentified city. Upon leaving a psychiatric hospital, Adrián (a young man from a well-off family) feels betrayed by his father, who has left the city, leaving his son the family house. He crosses paths with Gonzalo, an outcast who has a complicated relationship with his mother Raquel, a hooker.

Cast

Production 
The screenplay was penned by Pablo Malo. It boasted a budget of around €1.2 million. It was shot in October 2003 in the surroundings of San Sebastián, with some footage shot in Lisbon.

Release 
Cold Winter Sun premiered at the 52nd San Sebastián International Film Festival in September 2004. It also screened at the Viña del Mar International Film Festival, 4th 'EuropFilm' Mallorca Film Festival and the 5th Tudela Debut Film Festival. It was theatrically released in Spain on 12 November 2004.

Reception 
Nuria Vidal of Fotogramas rated the film 3 of 5 stars deeming it to be a "cold film", "in which the characters live in an absolute loneliness made of strange relationships between each other that gradually unravel".

Casimiro Torreiro of El País described Cold Winter Sun as a crime film displaying "a thick tone and a considerably gloomy look", hampered by the overaccumulation of edgy elements which thereby compromise the verisimilitude of a debut film otherwise promising vis-à-vis its making and the direction of actors.

Accolades 

|-
| rowspan = "4" align = "center" | 2005 || rowspan = "2" | 19th Goya Awards || Best New Director || Pablo Malo ||  || rowspan = "2" | 
|-
| Best Editing || Antonio Pérez Reina || 
|-
| rowspan = "2" | 14th Actors and Actresses Union Awards || rowspan = "2" | Best Film Actress in a Minor Role || Marta Etura ||  || rowspan = "2" | 
|-
| Raquel Pérez || 
|}

See also 
 List of Spanish films of 2004

References 

2004 drama films
2000s Spanish-language films
Spanish drama films
Films shot in the Basque Country (autonomous community)
Films shot in Lisbon
2000s Spanish films